David Burrows may refer to:

 David Burrows (artist) (born 1965), British contemporary artist and writer
 David Burrows (commissioner), member of the Northern Ireland Parades Commission
 David Burrows (footballer) (born 1968), English footballer
 David Burrows (sailor) (born 1977), Irish Olympic sailor
 Dave Burrows (born 1949), Canadian professional hockey player

See also
 David Burrowes (born 1969), British politician